The Catherine Violet Hubbard Animal Sanctuary was created in 2013 in honor of Catherine Violet Hubbard, a six-year-old killed at Sandy Hook Elementary School on December 14, 2012. Started by Catherine's parents, Jenny and Matt Hubbard, the goal of the sanctuary is to provide "“a place of compassion and acceptance where all creatures will know they are safe and people are kind, just as Catherine would have wanted.” Jenny Hubbard is the Executive Director of the Sanctuary and President of the Catherine Violet Hubbard Foundation.  

The sanctuary includes 34 acres of meadows and woodlands in Newtown, Connecticut. The sanctuary does not have a building at this time, though the property is open to the public from dawn to dusk.

References

External links
Official website

Animal sanctuaries
Animal charities based in the United States
2013 establishments in Connecticut